During the 2006–07 English football season, Mansfield Town Football Club competed in Football League Two where they finished in 17th position with 54 points.

Final league table

Results
Mansfield Town's score comes first

Legend

Football League Two

FA Cup

League Cup

Football League Trophy

Squad statistics

References
General
Mansfield Town 2006–07 at soccerbase.com (use drop down list to select relevant season)

Specific

2006-07
Mansfield Town